The Unkabogable Praybeyt Benjamin (also known as Praybeyt Benjamin) is a 2011 Filipino action, comedy, andparody film directed by Wenn V. Deramas. It stars Vice Ganda in the title role, alongside Eddie Garcia, Nikki Valdez, Vandolph Quizon, Derek Ramsay, and Jimmy Santos in their supporting roles. It is based on the comedy hit Private Benjamin.

Praybeyt Benjamin is the first Filipino film to break the P300 million mark in the box office. It was the highest grossing Filipino film in 2011 and was the highest-grossing Filipino film of all time until it was surpassed by Sisterakas in 2012. In 2012,  Box Office Entertainment Awards awarded Vice Ganda the Phenomenal Box Office Star for his role in the film. Deramas won Most Popular Film Director and Most Popular Screenwriter.

Plot
The film begins with a rundown of the conflicts in Philippine history that members of the Santos family fought in such as the Battle of Mactan, the Philippine Revolution and the Second World War

In the present day, Benjamin "Benjie" Santos VIII (Vice Ganda) is a gay dance instructor who lives with his parents and sisters Jesamine (Angelie Urquico) and Anjamin (Abby Bautista). His grandfather, Benjamin Santos VI (Eddie Garcia), unaware that he is gay, expects him to enlist in the Army like his ancestors. 

Benjie's father, Benjamin Santos VII (Jimmy Santos), gave up being a soldier to become a scientist and an inventor. Because this went against his grandfather's wishes, Benjie's family left his grandfather's house and moved to a cramped house. Benjie's father invents gadgets and unique deadly weapons, including the Utot-gun, a fan that shoots bullets, and a tiara that can potentially kill thousands of people.

A few years later, relatives invite Benjie's family to his grandfather's 75th birthday. At the party, his grandfather finds out Benjie is gay. The relatives tell Benjie's family to leave and never show themselves again. Grandfather declares them a disgrace to the Santos family.

A terrorist organization, Bandidos International, starts coordinated attacks and a civil war and kidnaps Benjie's grandfather and other high-ranking officials. The terrorist's leader, Abe Sayyep, claims they have taken over the whole country. In response the government reintroduces conscription. Benjie enlists in place of his ailing father. In the training camp, Benjie meets his platoon members and their commander Brandon Estolas (Derek Ramsay), to whom Benjie becomes secretly infatuated. 

Benjie's platoon initially performs poorly in training and is in danger of being dissolved. The men train at night and show improvement in the morning. A rival group is incensed with losing to Benjie's platoon during training. They get Benjie drunk and film him dancing lewdly and effeminately. The following morning, the Commanding General sees the video and makes Benjie leave the army. As Benjie is about to leave, his friends show solidarity and also leave the army. 

While traveling through a wooded area, Benjie and his friends accidentally stumble upon Bandidos International's base. They return to the army training camp to inform the Commanding General, but the official won't believe them. Based on the army's intelligence, the entire training camp believes the enemy base is in Tanay. However, when the army attacks Tanay, it is ambushed by hundreds of terrorists. Among the dead is Benjie's rival platoon.

Meanwhile, Benjie's group returns to the enemy's base. They see the captured officials, including Benjie's grandfather and their former commander, Brandon. They gain entry into the terrorist camp by dressing as women to trick the guards. Once inside, the group kills many terrorists using the inventions of Benjie's father. Benjie rescues his grandfather, Brandon, and the other generals. Benjie's grandfather thanks him and asks for forgiveness. They reunite with Benjie's group, but Abe Sayyep appears and attempts to shoot Benjie's grandfather. Benjie takes the bullet to save his grandfather. Benjie's friends kill Abe Sayyep.

In the afterlife, Benjie meets his ancestors, who are proud of him and say it is not yet time for him to die. Benjie revives, and the group returns home. They celebrate their victory with a party. Benjie lets Brandon know how he feels. Brandon rejects Benjie, saying he already has a fiancé—a woman who looks exactly like him but is voiced by Angelica Panganiban (Derek Ramsay's then-girlfriend).

The closing credits are interrupted by Captain Tenille telling General Santos that the president of the Philippines is summoning the country's bravest soldiers. Benjie and his team happily accept the president's call, saying there will be a part two to the movie.

Cast and characters

Main cast
Vice Ganda as Private Benjamin "Benjie" Santos VIII

Supporting cast
Eddie Garcia as Minister Marshal Benjamin "Bino" Santos VI
Jimmy Santos as Benjamin "Ben" Santos VII
Derek Ramsay as Brandon Estolas
Nikki Valdez as Lucresia Alcantara
Kean Cipriano as Emerson Ecleo
DJ Durano as Dominador "Dondi" Rosales
Vandolph Quizon as Buhawi Manay
Jojit Lorenzo as Joselito "Jojo / Jose" Makapagtagpo Jr. / Jose Remescal
Ricky Rivero as Big Boy Carnate
Mark Joseph Duran as Owl King

Recurring cast
Carlos Agassi as Paul Marigma
Bodie Cruz as George Carang
Tutti Caringal as Ringo Daway
Malou de Guzman as Lilibeth Santos
Dennis Padilla as Bentot Santos
Angelie Urquico as Jesamine Santos
Abby Bautista as Anjemin Santos
Tess Antonio as Lisa Santos
Jasper Visaya as Benten Santos
Rubi Rubi as Captain Tenille
Andrew Wolff as Abu Sayaff
Emilio Garcia as Billy Aladdin
Romhel Valera as Primitivo

Special Participation
Luis Manzano as Ericson
Angelica Panganiban as Voice of Herself / Brandon's Fiancé
Yam Concepcion (cameo)

Filming
Praybeyt Benjamin was filmed in the last half of 2010 and wrapped up in January 2011. The filmmakers used retro movie cameras and Fujifilm instead of modern movie cameras. It was the last movie to be made in 35mm film. The movie underwent restoration for Blu-Ray/4K release.

Reception

Release
The television trailer for Praybeyt Benjamin premiered during the talk show Gandang Gabi, Vice!, announcing its release on October 12, 2011. However, during the premiere of No Other Woman, the Praybeyt Benjamin trailer indicated a delayed premiere of October 26, 2011.

Rating
It was graded "B" by the Cinema Evaluation Board of the Philippines.

Box office
Praybeyt Benjamin opened with PHP 23.6 million in ticket sales on its first day. It broke Philippine box-office records after grossing PHP 109 million on its fourth day. After its seventh day on air, it reached the PHP 200 million mark. It broke the records set also by the previous Star Cinema-Viva Films produced film, No Other Woman.

Critical reaction
Although Praybeyt Benjamin is one of the highest-grossing of all time in the Philippines, its reviews ranged from mixed to negative. Most critics criticized the movie's overly simplistic story and outdated slapstick humor. However, many reviewers noted that the film's saving grace was the sharp comedic timing of Vice Ganda and the brilliant comic performance of Nikki Valdez.

Sequels

The Amazing Praybeyt Benjamin

In November 2011, ABS-CBN News reported that a sequel was in the works and would be released as early as 2013.  A later announcement made on It's Showtime revealed that the sequel would air on December 25, 2014. The Amazing Praybeyt Benjamin premiered on December 25, 2014, and was an official entry to the 40th Metro Manila Film Festival.

Third Praybeyt Benjamin film
A third film was announced as part of the 46th Metro Manila Film Festival, based on its script. Vice Ganda was expected to reprise his role. However, filming for the sequel was delayed due the COVID-19 pandemic as well as uncertainties caused by the non-renewal of ABS-CBN's broadcast franchise. The film failed to meet the festival's November 30, 2020, production deadline and as not among the final ten official entries of the 46th Metro Manila Film Festival. As of 2022, there are no further updates for the film.

Awards

References

External links
 
 Praybeyt Benjamin at Box Office Mojo

2011 films
Philippine LGBT-related films
Military humor in film
Star Cinema films
Viva Films films
Films directed by Wenn V. Deramas
Philippine parody films